Urminda Mascarenhas  e Lima Leitao (née Mascarenhas; 16 January 1926 – 20 February 2010) was an Indian politician, educator and businessperson from Goa. She was a former member of the Goa, Daman and Diu Legislative Assembly, representing the Mormugao Assembly constituency from 1963 to 1967.

Mascarenhas was the first woman MLA to be elected in the 1963 Goa, Daman and Diu Legislative Assembly election, also the first and only woman legislator from the Mormugao Assembly constituency. She was known for her diligent attitude and radical speeches in the state legislative assembly.

Personal life and education
Mascarenhas has completed her studies in Bachelor of Science and Bachelor of Training (now Bachelor of Education) from Bombay University. She was married to Marcelino Da Lima Leitao, they had six children together. In August 1972, Marcelino died, followed by her son, Noel at Calcutta in September 2009.

Career

Teaching
Mascarenhas was a principal at A.J De Almeida High School, Ponda from 1948 to 1952, before contesting in the Goa, Daman and Diu elections in 1963.

Politics
She was a founding member of United Goans Party (UGP) along with her husband, Marcelino and contested in the 1963 Goa, Daman and Diu Legislative Assembly election from the Mormugao Assembly constituency on the UGP ticket and emerged victorious, she served for five years from 1963 to 1967. Some of her mentors in politics were C. Rajagopalachari, S. Nijalingappa, former chief minister of Mysore State and Rajmohan Gandhi. Mascarenhas later left politics to join her husband in business in 1968.

Death
On 20 February 2010, Mascarenhas died from a prolonged illness at Dr. Baban's Nursing Home at Vasco da Gama, Goa.

Notes

References

1926 births
2010 deaths
20th-century Indian women politicians
Goa, Daman and Diu MLAs 1963–1967
People from North Goa district
United Goans Party politicians
Businesswomen from Goa